Marmet is a surname. Notable people with the surname include: 
Jürg Marmet (1927–2013), Swiss mountaineer
Paul Marmet (1932–2005), Canadian physicist and professor